Rhiwbina is the name of an electoral ward in the north of Cardiff, capital city of Wales. It covers the community of the same name.

Background
Rhiwbina became a ward to Cardiff City Council in 1967, after it was transferred from the Cardiff Rural District. It elected Conservative councillors for 28 years, until the 1995 elections to the new City and County of Cardiff Council saw Labour win all three seats.

Description
Rhiwbina is both an electoral ward, and a community.  There is no community council for the area.

The Rhiwbina ward is bordered to the west by the Whitchurch & Tongwynlais, to the east by the Llanishen and Lisvane wards. To the south is Cardiff's Heath ward, while Caerphilly's St Martins ward is immediately to the north.

The Rhiwbina ward elects three councillors to Cardiff Council. Since 1999 it has been represented by the Conservative Party or ex-Conservative Party members standing as Independents. In May 2012 independent councillor Jayne Cowan attracted more votes (3,808) than any other local election candidate in Wales. In June 2015 she rejoined the Conservative Party in the hope of standing in the Welsh Assembly elections. Fellow Rhiwbina councillor (also husband of Cllr Cowan) Adrian Robson also rejoined the Tories, in the hope of taking control of Cardiff Council from the Labour Party.

County councillors

May 2017

 

** = sitting councillor prior to the election, elected as an Independent at the previous election

References

Cardiff electoral wards